Siripudi is a village in Guntur district of the Indian state of Andhra Pradesh. It is located in Nagaram mandal of Tenali revenue division.

Governance 

Siripudi gram panchayat is the local self-government of the village. It is divided into wards and each ward is represented by a ward member.

Education 

As per the school information report for the academic year 2018–19, the village has 4 MPP schools.

See also 
List of villages in Guntur district

References 

Villages in Guntur district